Cecil Greenwood Hare (1875 – 14 July 1932) was an architect and designer based in England.

Life

He was born in Stamford, Lincolnshire in 1875, the son of John Thomas Hare (1844-1902) and Mary Ann.

Bodley and Hare
Hare was a pupil of the architect George Frederick Bodley. Bodley, who designed in a Gothic Revival style, had a long partnership with Thomas Garner: this partnership was dissolved after Garner converted to Catholicism. Hare was Bodley's chief assistant, and finally went into partnership with him.

Bodley died in 1907. Hare is described in Bodley's will as his secretary and received a legacy of £400. His brief obituary in The Times describes him as Bodley’s partner. He took over the practice of Bodley and Hare on Bodley's death.

Most of his own church work comprised fittings, and he produced output for Watts & Co.

Later work
He was partner of Albert Victor Heal from 1919 to 1924, by which time Heal (still calling himself Creed and Heal) and Bodley and Hare shared the same address at 11 Gray's Inn Square.

He died whilst the church of St Mildred, Addiscombe was being built, and a memorial to him was inserted in the church.

Works

 St Peter's Church, Ealing, Lady Chapel reredos executed by Hare in 1921, as well as later choirstalls.
St Benet's Church, Kentish Town, London, 1908–1928
St Stephen's Church, Sneinton Extended 1909–1912 
Dokett Building, Queens' College, Cambridge 1912
St John the Evangelist's Church, Middlesbrough, One-bay west extension to nave and aisles 1914
Calvary War Memorial, St Stephen's Church, Sneinton, 1920
Castle Donington War Memorial 1921
County War Memorial, Nottingham 1922
Wick (or Wyke) Manor, Worcestershire 1923–1924
Church of St Mary and St Giles, High Street, Stony Stratford, chancel 1928
St Mary's Church, Attenborough, choir stalls 1928
St Mildred's Church, Addiscombe 1931–1937
Walford War Memorial 1925 
Langrick War Memorial, 1920

References

1875 births
1932 deaths
20th-century English architects
People from Stamford, Lincolnshire
Architects from Lincolnshire